A meromictic lake is a lake which has layers of water that do not intermix. In ordinary, holomictic lakes, at least once each year, there is a physical mixing of the surface and the deep waters.

The term meromictic was coined by the Austrian Ingo Findenegg in 1935, apparently based on the older word holomictic. The concepts and terminology used in describing meromictic lakes were essentially complete following some additions by G. Evelyn Hutchinson in 1937.

Characteristics

Most lakes are holomictic; that is, at least once per year, physical mixing occurs between the surface and the deep waters. In so-called monomictic lakes, the mixing occurs once per year; in dimictic lakes, the mixing occurs twice a year (typically spring and autumn), and in polymictic lakes, the mixing occurs several times a year. In meromictic lakes, however, the layers of the lake water can remain unmixed for years, decades, or centuries.

Meromictic lakes can usually be divided into three sections or layers. The bottom layer is known as the monimolimnion; the waters in this portion of the lake circulate little, and are generally hypoxic and saltier than the rest of the lake. The top layer is called the mixolimnion, and essentially behaves like a holomictic lake. The area in between is referred to as the chemocline, also called the chemolimnion.

The lack of mixing between layers creates radically different environments for organisms to live in: among the consequences of this stratification, or stable layering, of lake waters is that the bottom layer receives little oxygen from the atmosphere, hence becomes depleted of oxygen. While the surface layer may have 10 mg/L or more dissolved oxygen in summer, the depths of a meromictic lake can have less than 1 mg/L. Very few organisms can live in such an oxygen-poor environment. One exception is purple sulfur bacteria. These bacteria, commonly found at the top of the monimolimnion in such lakes, use sulfur compounds such as sulfides in photosynthesis. These compounds are produced by decomposition of organic sediments in oxygen-poor environments. The monimolimnion is often rich in phosphorus and nitrogen. These factors combine to create an ideal environment for bacterial growth. The mixolimnion can have similar qualities. However, the types of bacteria that can grow at the surface are determined by the amount of light received at the surface.

A meromictic lake may form because the basin is unusually deep and steep-sided compared to the lake's surface area, or because the lower layer of the lake is highly saline and denser than the upper layers of water.

Stratification in meromictic lakes can be either endogenic or ectogenic. Endogenic means the patterns seen in the lake are caused by internal events, such as organic matter accumulating in the sediments and decaying, whereas ectogenic means the patterns seen are caused by external causes, like an intrusion of saltwater settling in the hypolimnion, preventing it from mixing.

The layers of sediment at the bottom of a meromictic lake remain relatively undisturbed because there is little physical mixing and few living organisms to agitate them.  There is also little chemical decomposition. For this reason, cores of the sediment at the bottom of meromictic lakes are important in tracing past changes in climate at the lake, by examining trapped pollen grains and the types of sediments [see Proxy (climate)].

When the layers do mix for whatever reason, the consequences can be devastating for organisms that normally live in the mixolimnion. This layer is usually much smaller in volume than the monimolimnion. When the layers mix, the oxygen concentration at the surface will decrease dramatically. This can result in the death of many organisms, such as fish, that require oxygen.

Occasionally, carbon dioxide or other dissolved gases can build up relatively undisturbed in the lower layers of a meromictic lake. When the stratification is disturbed, as could happen from an earthquake, a limnic eruption may result. In 1986, a notable event of this type took place at Lake Nyos in Cameroon, causing nearly 1,800 deaths.

While it is mainly lakes that are meromictic, the world's largest meromictic basin is the Black Sea. The deep waters below  do not mix with the upper layers that receive oxygen from the atmosphere. As a result, over 90% of the deeper Black Sea volume is anoxic water. The Caspian Sea is anoxic below . The Baltic Sea is persistently stratified, with dense, highly saline water comprising the bottom layer, and large areas of hypoxic sediments (see Baltic Sea hypoxia).

List of meromictic lakes

There are meromictic lakes all over the world. The distribution appears to be clustered, but this may be due to incomplete investigations. Depending on the exact definition of "meromictic", the ratio between meromictic and holomictic lakes worldwide is around 1:1000.

Africa
 Lake Nyos and Lake Monoun in Cameroon
 Lake Kivu in Rwanda and the Democratic Republic of the Congo
 Lake Tanganyika in Burundi, the Democratic Republic of the Congo, Tanzania and Zambia
 Lake Malawi, located between Malawi, Mozambique and Tanzania

Antarctica
 Lake Vanda in Ross Dependency
 21 lakes, including Organic Lake in Vestfold Hills

Asia
 Lake Shira in the Republic of Khakassia, Russia
 Keracut Beach Lake, Penang National Park, northwest Penang island, Malaysia
 Jellyfish Lake, on Eil Malk in Palau
 Zigetangcuo Lake, a crenogenic lake in Nagqu, Tibet, China. It is the meromictic lake located at the highest altitude.
 Kaptai Lake, in Rangamati Hill District, at the southeastern part of Bangladesh. It was created by constructing a dam at Kaptai to set up a hydroelectric power plant.
 Lake Matano, Sulawesi island, Indonesia

Australia
 Lake Fidler, in the Tasmanian Wilderness World Heritage Area

Europe
  (Alpine lakes in the Austrian province of Carinthia; studied by Ingo Findenegg in the 1930s).
 Alatsee (small alpine lake in Germany's state of Bavaria, near the city of Füssen and Neuschwanstein Castle)
 Lake  in Finland
 Lake  in Finland
 Lough Furnace in Ireland
 Salvatnet, Kilevann, Tronstadvatn, Birkelandsvatn, Rørholtfjorden, Botnvatn, Rørhopvatn and Strandvatn lakes in Norway
 Czarne Lake in Drawa National Park, Poland
 Lake Mogilnoye in Murmansk Oblast of Russia
 Lakes El Tobar and La Cruz in Spain
 Lake Cadagno, crenogenic, in Switzerland, and the location of the Alpine Biology Center
 The Black Sea is also considered to be meromictic.

North America

 Canada
 Lake McKay in Ottawa, Ontario
 Lakes A and C1 on Ellesmere Island, Nunavut
 Blackcat Lake near Dorset, Ontario, in Frost Centre
 Crawford Lake near Milton, Ontario
 Picard Lake near Lakehurst, Ontario
 Mahoney Lake in the Okanagan Valley, British Columbia
 McGinnis Lake in Petroglyphs Provincial Park, Ontario
 Pink Lake in Gatineau Park, Quebec
 Powell Lake in the town of Powell River, British Columbia
 Sunfish Lake near Waterloo, Ontario
 Little Round Lake (Ontario) in Central Frontenac, Ontario
 Teapot Lake, Heart Lake Conservation Area, Brampton, Ontario. See also Heart Lake (Ontario)
 Central America
 Lake Atitlán, endorheic lake in the department of Sololá, Guatemala
 United States
 Ballston Lake, north northwest of Albany, New York
 Big Soda Lake, Nevada
 Brownie Lake near Minneapolis, Minnesota
 Canyon Lake near Big Bay, Michigan
 Chapel Lake, in Pictured Rocks National Lakeshore, near Munising, Michigan
 Great Salt Lake near Salt Lake City, Utah
 Green Lake and Round Lake in Green Lakes State Park near Syracuse, New York
 Hot Lake in Okanogan County, Washington
 Irondequoit Bay near Rochester, New York, is also considered meromictic; use of road salt has been cited as the main reason for its change
 Knaack Lake, Wisconsin
 Lake Mary, in the northwest corner of Vilas County, Wisconsin
 Lower Mystic Lake in Arlington and Medford, Massachusetts
 Redoubt Lake near Sitka, Alaska; one of North America's largest meromictic lakes
 Soap Lake in Washington

References

External links

"Density Stratification", part of an educational website Water on the Web operated by the University of Minnesota, Duluth. Retrieved 11-March-2007.
Lake Fidler revived
photo-outing.com review over Pantai Kerachut with Memomictic lake

Lakes by type